CCGS Gordon Reid is an offshore fisheries patrol vessel of the Canadian Coast Guard. The vessel entered service in 1990 on the West Coast of Canada and is still in active service.

Design and description
The ship is powered by four Deutz 628 geared diesel engines driving two controllable pitch propellers and bow thrusters creating . The vessel is also equipped with one Mitsubishi 6D14T emergency generator. The patrol vessel has a complement of 14 composed of 6 officers and 8 crew and has 8 spare berths.

Service history
The vessel was constructed by Versatile Pacific Shipyards at their yard in  Vancouver, British Columbia with the yard number 557. The ship entered service with the Canadian Coast Guard in October 1990 but was not completed until December 1991. Named for Gordon Reid, a British Columbian who was famous along the British Columbia Coast for his knowledge of the area, the ship is registered in Ottawa, Ontario but homeported at the Coast Guard base at Victoria, British Columbia.

Ordered by the Canadian Coast Guard to replace the older R-class cutters in the Western Region, Gordon Reid is used for fisheries patrol and search and rescue. In October 2014 the Russian container ship  lost the use of its engines near environmentally sensitive Haida Gwaii. Gordon Reid was the first vessel to try to tow the disabled vessel to keep the container ship from running aground. However, Gordon Reids own engines were not powerful enough. The American ocean-going tugboat  was dispatched from nearby Prince Rupert, British Columbia to tow the disabled Russian vessel. In November 2015, the American-flagged cargo ship North Star lost power while transiting from Anchorage, Alaska to Tacoma, Washington. Gordon Reid was deployed to aid the ship, but North Star managed to get her engines going again and arrived in port without assistance. In October 2020, Gordon Reid rescued two people from the sailboat Second Star after it lost steering in the Pacific Ocean.

See also
  - sister ship

References

Notes

Citations

Sources
 
 
 

Patrol vessels of the Canadian Coast Guard
1990 ships
Ships built in British Columbia
Ships of the Canadian Coast Guard